Leso may refer to:

People
 John Leso (born 1966), American psychologist and army officer
 Miroljub Lešo (1946–2019), Yugoslav and Serbian actor
 Piermaria Leso (born 1991), Italian rugby union player

Places
 
 , Congo
 San Sebastián Airport (ICAO:LESO), Spain

Other
 Law Enforcement Support Office
 East African textiles also known as kangas